Great American Gymnastics Express, known also as GAGE Center or just GAGE, is an American artistic gymnastics academy, located in Blue Springs, Missouri.

History 
GAGE was founded in 1979 by its present-day owner and head coach, Al Fong.

Notable Gymnasts and Alumni 
GAGE is known for producing high-level gymnasts, including the following:

Madison Desch:
 2014 World Championships US team gold medalist (traveling alternate)
 2014 Pan American Championships team champion
 2015 Pan American Games team champion and all-around silver medalist
 Alabama gymnastics (2017–20)

Brenna Dowell:
 2013 World Championships alternate
 2014 World Championships alternate
 2015 World Championships team champion
 Oklahoma Gymnastics (2015, 17–19) – 4x NCAA champion

Kara Eaker: 
 2020 Olympic team alternate
 2018 World Championships team gold medalist
 2019 World Championships team gold medalist
 2018 Pan American Championships team and balance beam champion; floor exercise bronze medalist
 2019 Pan American Games team and balance beam champion; floor exercise silver medalist
 Utah Gymnastics (2022–25)

Aleah Finnegan:
 2019 Pan American Games team champion
 2021 Southeast Asian Games team and vault champion; all-around and balance beam silver medalist
 LSU Gymnastics (2022–25)

Sarah Finnegan:
 2012 Olympic Games alternate
 2010 Pan American Championships team champion and balance beam bronze medalist
 LSU Gymnastics (2016–19) – 2x NCAA champion

Christy Henrich:
 1989 World Championships competitor

Ivana Hong:
 2007 World Championships team champion
 2007 Pan American Games team champion and all-around bronze medalist
 2008 Olympic Games alternate
 2009 World Championships balance beam bronze medalist

Terin Humphrey:
 2003 World Championships team champion 
 2004 Olympic Games team and uneven bars silver medalist
 Alabama Gymnastics – 2x NCAA champion

Courtney McCool: 
 2004 Olympic Games team silver medalist
 2003 Pan American Games team champion and vault silver medalist
 Georgia Gymnastics – 4x NCAA Champion

Leanne Wong: 
 2022 World Championships team gold medalist
 2021 World Championships all-around silver medalist & floor exercise bronze medalist
 2020 Olympic team alternate
 2018 Junior National Champion
 2019 American Cup gold medalist
 2019 Pan American Games team champion and uneven bars silver medalist
 2019 World Championships non-traveling alternate
 Florida Gymnastics (2022–25)

Controversy
In the late 1980s and early 1990s, GAGE found controversy when two of their gymnasts met with tragic circumstances:

Julissa Gomez broke her neck while warming up for vault at a competition in Japan in May 1988. Observers had noticed her struggle with the apparatus over the months leading up to the competition including her former coach Béla Károlyi, past and present teammates, and even her present coach Al Fong.  Gomez's technique on the extremely difficult Yurchenko vault had been described as shaky at best, and Gomez was unable to perform the vault with any consistency during practices, sometimes missing her feet on the springboard.   A teammate from Károlyi's, Chelle Stack, later stated, "You could tell it was not a safe vault for her to be doing. Someone along the way should have stopped her." However, Julissa's coaches insisted that she needed to continue training and competing the Yurchenko vault in order to achieve high scores. Gomez fell into a coma during treatment due to a hospital error and never awoke, passing away in 1991.

Christy Henrich died from anorexia nervosa in 1994. Her condition was allegedly spurred by comments from international judges and her coaches. Desperate to move up the ranks in the highly competitive world of Olympic-level gymnastics, Henrich took the criticisms to heart; her drive to lose a few pounds progressed to unhealthy eating habits and, eventually, became full-blown anorexia nervosa.  At the time of her passing she weighed 47 pounds. The impact of her illness and death led to changes in the way coaches across the nation implement nutrition in training, as well as how television and media discuss gymnasts' bodies.

References 

Companies established in 1979
Gymnastics clubs
Gymnastics clubs in the United States
Gymnastics in Missouri